The 2008 Women's Australian Hockey League was the 16th edition women's field hockey tournament. The tournament was held between 24 March – 5 April 2008.

WA Diamonds won the tournament for the fifth time after defeating QLD Scorchers 2–0 in the final. Canberra Strikers finished in third place after defeating NSW Arrows 2–0 in the third and fourth place playoff.

Participating Teams

 Canberra Strikers
 NSW Arrows
 NT Pearls
 QLD Scorchers
 Southern Suns
 Tassie Van Demons
 VIC Vipers
 WA Diamonds

Competition format
The 2008 Women's Australian Hockey League consisted of a single round robin format, followed by classification matches.

Teams from all 8 states and territories competed against one another throughout the pool stage. At the conclusion of the pool stage, the top four ranked teams progressed to the semi-finals, while the bottom four teams continued to the classification stage.

Point Allocation
All matches had an outright result, meaning drawn matches were decided in either golden goal extra time, or a penalty shoot-out. Match points were as follows:

· 3 points for a win
· 1 points to each team in the event of a draw
· 1 point will be awarded to the winner of the shoot-out
· 0 points to the loser of the match

Results

Preliminary round

Pool matches

Classification round

Fifth to eighth place classification

Crossover

Seventh and eighth place

Fifth and sixth place

First to fourth place classification

Semi-finals

Third and fourth place

Final

Awards

Statistics

Final standings

Goalscorers

References

External links

2008
2008 in Australian women's field hockey